There are numerous references to Dutch painter M.C. Escher in popular culture.

References to Relativity

Film

The idea of Shahram Mokri's 2013 film Fish & Cat was inspired by Escher's paintings. The director gives a change in the perspective of time in one single shot.

In Night at the Museum: Secret of the Tomb (2014), Sir Lancelot, Teddy Roosevelt, and Larry Daley enter the painting Relativity, and experience the same strange gravity featured in the painting.

In Dario Argento's Suspiria (1977), Escher's art is painted on several walls, as well as the main location of the film being on the fictitious "Escherstrasse", an obvious nod to the artist.

The film Labyrinth (1986) features a room based on the painting Relativity.

The slasher film A Nightmare on Elm Street 5: The Dream Child (1989) features a pastiche of House of Stairs or Relativity conjured up by Freddy Krueger in his dream dimension, referred to in the script as the "Escher Maze", where it is described as "an Escheresque, expressionistic landscape" and "an insane, logic-defying world where water runs uphill and stairs and doors stand at impossible angles to one another."

Television

The Captain Future anime series features a variation of Escher's Relativity in its 40th episode "Nightmare World: 4th Dimension" (悪夢の世界・四次元; Akumu no sekai shi-jigen) as the home dimension of alien energy creatures.

The Comedy Central animated series Drawn Together has a first-season episode, "Clara's Dirty Little Secret", where Clara believes she is pregnant, and Toot suggests that she fall down some stairs. Clara thinks of a suitable room and leads them to the "M. C. Escher room", where Toot pushes Clara down (and up, around and back down) a flight of stairs.

The FOX animated series Family Guy has alluded to Escher on three occasions. In "Brian Goes Back to College", Stewie and Brian share a room where Stewie puts up a framed print of Relativity, which he calls "Crazy Stairs". He then breaks it while playing Ultimate Frisbee and asks "Oh no, did that hit crazy stairs?" A later episode, "No Meals on Wheels", features Peter complaining that the fact that his new restaurant is attracting paraplegics "is weirder than that rap video by M.C. Escher". Escher is then depicted inside Relativity dressed like MC Hammer in "U Can't Touch This" and rapping, "Going up the stairs and going down the stairs and going up the stairs and going down the stairs and going up the sideways stairs."

In another episode Stewie tells Brian he makes “less sense than M.C. Escher’s floor plan”, and then the episode shows the constructor complaining the architect Escher that he cannot put six stairways “all in one spot” and because of that workers are quitting. 

In the Teen Titans first season episode "Mad Mod", its eponymous villain traps the Titans in an illusionary setting based on Escher's works.

On the SyFy sci-fi series Warehouse 13, Escher is said by Leena to be one of the architects, along with Thomas Edison and Nikola Tesla, who designed the Warehouse. The Escher Vault's design resembles the lithograph Relativity. Inside this vault, the stairwells and walls are constantly moving. Anyone not wearing specially designed glasses run the risk of being lost forever once inside. H.G. Wells is the only known individual to have successfully navigated the Escher Vault without glasses, instead using her Inperceptor Vest to retrieve personal items stored within.

In the Star vs. the Forces of Evil episode "Interdimensional Field Trip", Sabrina, the classmate of Star falls in a construction similar to Relativity.

The Rick and Morty episode "Morty's Mind Blowers" opens with the titular characters fleeing from a humanoid creature set in a place similar to Relativity.

The Futurama episode "I, Roommate" features Relativity as one of the living spaces Fry and Bender are considering living in.

Escher is alluded to in the Phineas and Ferb episode "Gaming the System" in which Candace is found in an environment similar to Relativity.

The Final Space episode "Chapter Three" features a construct alluding to Escher.

In Yu-Gi-Oh!, Yami Yugi's mind in the Millenium Puzzle is represented as a construction similar to Relativity, to emphasize the confusion he feels about who he is.

Hwang Dong-hyuk, director of Squid Game,
said in an interview with Netflix that the set's
maze-like corridors and stairs were inspired by
M.C. Escher's Relativity.

In Transformers: Cyberverse, “the End of the Universe part 2” Optimus, Bumblebee and Wheeljack get stranded in a dimension with infinite stairs connecting to each other defying the laws of gravity. The space is an allusion to the impossible object thematic of Escher.

Video games

In the city building game Afterlife,  Hell's ultimate punishment for Envy is called the Escher pit and is designed to torture souls by having them all be given different punishments, and after a few days are allowed to switch with a neighbor, thinking he / she is better off, only to find that all punishments are worse than the last. The outside slightly resembles Relativity.

In Final Fantasy IX, the third-disc dungeon Ipsen's Castle is modeled after the painting, featuring an array of inverted ladders and stairs.

In AdventureQuest Worlds, the first lord of chaos is Escherion, who has the ability to invert objects and lives in a castle with an inside similar to "Relativity".

In the Psygnosis game Lemmings, the 18th level of "Taxing" is named "Tribute to M.C. Escher", as the solution involves building a zigzag stairway slightly reminiscent of Relativity.

In God of War III, 'Hera's Garden' is a Escher inspired puzzle in which the player must manipulate various objects and the camera perspective to guide protagonist Kratos to the exit.

In Knock-Knock game, one of fragments of reality is a reference to  Escher's work.

During the last decades several video games have been released, some of which are more or less inspired by the art of M.C. Escher, such as Monument Valley. Some games borrow the graphical art style; some games contain game mechanics that are heavily influenced by the artist while others are simply put tributes to the works of M.C. Escher.

Music
 
The cover of Mike Oldfield's Boxed (1976) mimics two of Escher's works: "Gallery" and "Other World".

The cover of British band Mott the Hoople's self-titled debut album features a colorized reproduction of Escher's lithograph Reptiles.

American rock band Chagall Guevara recorded the song "Escher's World" from their 1991 eponymous album.
 
In the video "Around the World" (1997) of Daft Punk, men and women, dressed like mummies similar to those in Escher's painting, perpetually walk around on a stair.

"Escher", a song on Teenage Fanclub's album Thirteen, with lyrics that deal with disorientation.

The song "Mansion Party" by Ninja Sex Party features the line "Take an upside-down left at the M.C. Escher Stairs" and the song's animated music video shows a scene similar to that of Relativity.

In the song "White and Nerdy" by "Weird Al" Yankovic, he says "M.C. Escher, that's my favorite M.C."

American jazz saxophonist Michael Brecker has recorded a composition entitled "Escher Sketch (A Tale of Two Rhythms)". The album that features it, "Now You See It… (Now You Don't)", also has M.C.Escher's artwork on the cover.

Other

Andrew Lipson created a Lego version of Relativity.

In 1981, Austria issued a postage stamp featuring Escher's Impossible Dice Construction and a 1998 Netherlands stamp illustrated a portrait of the artist alongside one of his works.

In 2007, a Relativity inspired "Endless Staircase" room was added to Walt Disney World's Haunted Mansion attraction.

In 2017, four combs and 244 steps from old wooden-stepped escalators at Wynyard railway station, Sydney, Australia, were "refashioned into a soaring crisscrossing tangle reminiscent of an Escher puzzle" named 'Interloop', designed by local artist Chris Fox and hanging from a ceiling above one of the new sets of escalators.

References to other works

The Doctor Who episode "Castrovalva" takes its name from Escher's early lithograph of the same name, though Escher's view of Castrovalva has none of the paradoxical elements of his later works to which the setting of the episode could more readily be compared.

Sheila Chandra included a piece called "Escher's Triangle" on her CD Roots and Wings - the title refers to Escher's use of the Penrose triangle in pictures like Waterfall.

A comic crossover between Mike Allred's Madman and Bernie Mireault's The Jam, features Escher as a central character when the two characters enter into an alternate universe created by a somewhat godlike Escher, based on many of his works.

In 2006 Audi released a commercial with many Escher-inspired scenes.

The bonus stages of the first Sonic the Hedgehog game, for the Sega Genesis/Mega Drive, feature an animated background of birds turning into fish, a reference to Sky and Water I.

In The Thief and the Cobbler, there is a chase sequence that contains set pieces loosely based on Escher's works. Monument Valley and its sequel features puzzles that are loosely based on Escher's works.

In 2016, in The Hidden Oracle the first book of the serie The Trials of Apollo written by Rick Riordan, Apollo notes that the paintings on the walls of the cave of the pythia Rachel resemble the work of M. C. Escher.

In the film Inception, Arthur demonstrates to Ariadne how to make unbreakable mental mazes by constructing infinite structures. He points out that during their long conversation, they have been traversing the same single flight of stairs, and the camera pans out to show a staircase similar to Escher's Ascending and Descending.

See also 
Video games inspired by M. C. Escher

References

Popular culture
Escher, M. C.